Homebush railway station is a former station on the Avoca railway line in Victoria, Australia. It served the gold-mining town of Homebush.

History 
The first section of line was opened in October 1874, as a  branch from Maryborough to Avoca. It was extended to Ararat in November 1890. Once completed, it formed a  through-route between two main lines. In 1888, the fares to Melbourne were 20 shillings and 13 shillings.

There was a Post Office at the Homebush station which opened in 1914 and was closed in 1919. 

In July 1959, the line between Avoca and Ararat was closed. It was reopened in October 1966 and in 1996, it was converted to standard gauge, along with the main Melbourne–Adelaide railway. The Avoca–Ararat section of the line was unused for several years, and Pacific National used it to store over 100 surplus grain wagons, until many of them were reactivated to carry the 2011–2012 harvest.

The Avoca line reopened in 2018, following a complete rebuild as part of the Murray Basin Rail Project, which extended the reach of the standard gauge network in Victoria.

See also
 Adelaide Lead, the railway
 Ararat railway station
 Ben Nevis railway station
 Bung Bong, Victoria

References

External links 
  Avoca and District Historical Society
  Prior website of the Avoca and District Historical Society
 Avoca station images
 Homebush line details

Disused railway stations in Victoria (Australia)